Maxwell James Russell (born September 4, 1940) is an educator and former political figure in Newfoundland and Labrador, Canada. He represented Lewisporte in the Newfoundland and Labrador House of Assembly from 1971 to 1975 and from 1982 to 1989 as a Progressive Conservative.

He was born in Lewisporte, the son of William Stewart Russell and Blanche Burt, and was educated there and at Memorial University. He taught school in Comfort Cove and Lewisporte. Russell married Mary Buffett. Before entering provincial politics, Russell served on the town council for Lewisporte. He was defeated when he ran for reelection to the House of Assembly in 1975. From 1977 to 1982, he was personnel manager for the Newfoundland and Labrador Housing Corporation. Russell was speaker for the House of Assembly from 1972 to 1975 and from 1982 to 1985. He served in the provincial cabinet as Minister of Consumer Affairs and Communications and as Minister of the Environment. Russell retired from politics in 1989.

References 

Progressive Conservative Party of Newfoundland and Labrador MHAs
Liberal Party of Newfoundland and Labrador MHAs
People from Lewisporte
1940 births
Living people